Dennis railway station is located on the Hurstbridge line in Victoria, Australia. It serves the north-eastern Melbourne suburb of Northcote, and opened on 4 February 1924.

History
Opening on 4 February 1924, Dennis station is named after Northcote Councillor William Dennis, a member of the council for over 40 years.

In 1964, boom barriers replaced hand-operated gates at the Victoria Road level crossing, located nearby in the down direction of the station.

In 1979, the current station buildings were provided.

Platforms and services
Dennis has two side platforms. It is served by Hurstbridge line trains.

Platform 1:
  all stations and limited express services to Flinders Street

Platform 2:
  all stations and limited express services to Macleod, Greensborough, Eltham and Hurstbridge

Transport links
Kinetic Melbourne operates two routes via Dennis station, under contract to Public Transport Victoria:
 : Queen Street (Melbourne CBD) – La Trobe University Bundoora Campus
 : Queen Street (Melbourne CBD) – Northland Shopping Centre

References

External links
 Melway map at street-directory.com.au

Railway stations in Melbourne
Railway stations in Australia opened in 1924
Railway stations in the City of Darebin